Alexander Ruttkay (born 24 April 1941) is a Hungarian archeologist and historian. The head of the Archeological Institute of Slovak Academy of Science in Nitra in 1991-2008.

Ruttkay was born in Budapest, Hungary. He graduated from high school in Piešťany in 1958, then studied archeology at the Faculty of Philosophy at Comenius University in Bratislava (1958-1963).  He deals with problems of the settlement structure and historical demography, early feudal settlements in the 9th-13th century, Christianisation and the oldest religious buildings. He worked in leading positions in research and academic institutions in Czechoslovakia and Slovakia. He led a successful field research in archeological sites in Koš - Klatkej kopec, Ducové "Kostelec", Nitrianska Blatnica "Jurko", Partizánske - Šimovany, Nitra - Dražovce, etc.

Ruttkay is a member of international scientific organisations like European Academy of Sciences and Arts, Committee of International Union for Prehistoric and Protohistoric Sciences (UNESCO), German Archaeological Institute, executive committee of international castellological association Castrum Bene (president of the society, 1998-2000) and others.

Awards 
 Silver medal of Ľudovít Štúr, Slovak Academy of Sciences (1996)
 Gold medal of Ľudovít Štúr, Slovak Academy of Sciences (2001)
 Honorary citizen of Piešťany, Ducové and Nitrianska Blatnica
 Silver medal of Constantine the Philosopher University in Nitra (2001)
 State award 1st Class Pribina Cross (2007)
 Award of the Ministry of Education, Science, Research and Sport for life-work (2011)
 Award of town Nitra (2011)
 Premium of Literary Fund, Section for scientific and professional literature and computer programs for the development of science Slovakia and abroad ( 2012)

Sources

1941 births
20th-century Slovak historians
Members of the Slovak Academy of Sciences
Comenius University alumni
Living people
21st-century Slovak historians